Devinn Lane is a former adult model, pornographic actress, writer, director and producer. She is sometimes credited as Devin Lane or Devon Lane.

Biography 
Lane became pregnant at 16 and began stripping to support herself and her child in 1990. In 1996, while still dancing, she was offered work posing in hard-core men's magazines.

Adult film career 
She made her hardcore film debut in 1999, performing in only lesbian scenes. She signed an exclusive contract for the production company Wicked Pictures in December 1999. She has directed many films, notably all five installments of The Devinn Lane Show. In 2003, she began performing with men, starting with the final scene in The Devinn Lane Show 5: Save The Best For Last. Over the next two years she performed scenes with men in Kink, Lovestruck, Space Nuts, Improper Conduct, Wicked Sex Party 6, Beautiful, Stiletto, Tuff Chick, two Road Trixx movies (which she also directed), and Lovers Lane.

As of 2005, she went on indefinite hiatus from on-screen work, focusing on directing for the production company Shane's World.

Her first producer credit is on the film Beautiful/Nasty which was nominated for the AVN Award Best All-Girl Feature in 2002.

In addition to hardcore work, Lane also hosted Playboy TV's mock reality show 7 Lives Exposed, which ran for six seasons until 2007, and has appeared in several softcore films which appear on DVD and on the Cinemax channels.

Lawsuit 
In October 2008, Lane filed a copyright infringement lawsuit against Digital Playground, Vivid Entertainment Group, and Moniker Online Services among other entities, alleging that they profited from domain names similar to her performer name and did not compensate her. In February 2009, she dismissed her claims against most of the companies, leaving only Privacy Protect and Pixel named in the suit.

Notable TV guest appearances 
 Thrills playing "Denise" in episode: "A Most Dangerous Desire" (episode # 1.2), June 9, 2001
 The Helmetcam Show playing "Herself – Guest" (episode # 5.1), July 5, 2000
 The Man Show playing "Herself" in episode: "Wheel of Destiny" (episode # 2.3), July 2, 2000
 The Helmetcam Show playing "Herself – Guest" (episode # 4.17), May 17, 2000
 The Helmetcam Show playing "Herself – Guest" (episode # 4.8), December 1, 1999
 The Howard Stern Radio Show playing "Herself", October 16, 1999

Awards and nominations

References

External links

 
 
 
 Bio at Wicked Pictures
 Audio Interview at Adult DVD Talk
 Interview at Broken Dollz

Year of birth missing (living people)
Living people
Actresses from Newport Beach, California
American female adult models
American pornographic film actresses
American pornographic film directors
American pornographic film producers
Film directors from California
Penthouse Pets
Pornographic film actors from California
Women pornographic film directors
Women pornographic film producers
American adoptees
21st-century American women